Periya Idathu Mappillai is a 1997 Indian Tamil language comedy film directed by Guru Dhanapal. The film stars Jayaram, Goundamani, Manivannan, Devayani and Mantra. It was released on 22 August 1997. The film is a remake of the Malayalam film Aniyan Bava Chetan Bava.

Plot

Periya Thambi (Vijayakumar) and Chinna Thambi (Rajan P. Dev) are brothers and owners of a company. Gopalakrishnan (Jayaram) is from a poor family, despite being a graduate, he cannot find a job. To support his family, he becomes the driver of Periya Thambi and Chinna Thambi. Periya Thambi's daughter Lakshmi (Devayani) and Chinna Thambi's daughter Priya (Mantra) fall in love with Gopalakrishnan. What transpires later forms the crux of the story.

Cast

Jayaram as Gopalakrishnan
Goundamani as Kaali
Manivannan as Manian Gounder
Devayani as Lakshmi
Mantra as Priya
Vijayakumar as Periya Thambi
Rajan P. Dev as Chinna Thambi
R. Sundarrajan as Gopalakrishnan's father
Pandiyan as Pandiyan
Ponvannan as Chellappa
Vivek as Ramu
Halwa Vasu as Vasu
Kalaignanam as Gopalakrishnan's grandfather
Chokkalinga Bhagavathar as Gopalakrishnan's great-grandfather
LIC Narasimhan
Kalaranjini as Chinnavar's wife
Vijaya Chandrika as Gopalakrishnan's mother
Janaki as Gopalakrishnan's grandmother
Radhabhai as Gopalakrishnan's great-grandmother

Production
During the shoot of Periya Idathu Mappillai, Guru Dhanapal was simultaneously making another film with Jayaram titled Raja Magal which did not release.

Soundtrack

The film score and the soundtrack were composed by Sirpy. The soundtrack, released in 1997, features 4 tracks with lyrics written by Kalidasan and Palani Bharathi.

References

1997 films
1990s Tamil-language films
Tamil remakes of Malayalam films
1997 romantic comedy films
Indian romantic comedy films
Films scored by Sirpy
Films directed by Guru Dhanapal
Indian comedy films